Juqhun K'ark'a (Aymara juqhu muddy place, -n(i) a suffix, k'ark'a crevice, fissure, crack, "a crevice with a muddy place", also spelled Jucun Karka, Jukun Karka) is a mountain in the western extensions of the Cordillera Real in the Andes of Bolivia which reaches a height of approximately . It is located in the La Paz Department, Los Andes Province, Batallas Municipality. Juqhun K'ark'a lies southwest of Qullqi Chata and west of Laram Salla.

References 

Mountains of La Paz Department (Bolivia)